Elections to Cannock Chase District Council took place on 5 May 2022 on the same day as other local elections in England, Scotland and Wales. All but two of the council's wards were up for election, meaning a total of 13 councillors were elected.

At the previous local election in Cannock Chase, the Conservatives won their first overall majority in the history of the council. They were defending five seats and hoping to gain further seats in order to expand their majority. Labour had suffered a complete wipeout in 2021, losing all of the nine seats they were defending; they were therefore hoping to bounce back from this result and retain the six wards they won in 2018. One councillor who had defected from the Green Party to the localist Chase Community Independent Group stood down, with the latter opting not to contest that seat; the Chase Indies instead hoped to make gains elsewhere. The Liberal Democrats were defending one seat and did not field a candidate in any other wards.

The result was a minimal change compared to when these seats were last contested in 2018. The Conservatives held their five wards and gained one from Labour who in turn held their remaining five seats. It was no change elsewhere in the district: the Green Party regained the Rawnsley ward and the Liberal Democrats held their Brereton and Ravenhill seat. Across the district, there was a small 1% swing to Labour compared to 2018; compared to 2021, the swing to Labour was 9.6%, reflecting the substantial change since the Conservatives' landslide victory.

Summary

Election result

Council Composition
Prior to the election, the composition of the council was:

After the election, the composition of the council was:

Ward results
Vote share changes are based on the results achieved by parties in 2016 when these seats were last contested.

Brereton and Ravenhill

Cannock East

Cannock North

Cannock South

Cannock West

Etching Hill and the Heath

Hawks Green

Heath Hayes East & Wimblebury

Hednesford Green Heath

Hednesford North

Norton Canes

Rawnsley

Western Springs

References

Cannock Chase
2022
2020s in Staffordshire
May 2022 events in the United Kingdom